Paul Taylor Dance Company is a modern dance company, formed by dancer and choreographer Paul Taylor (1930—2018). The modern dance company is based in New York, New York and was founded in 1954.

Taylor originally performed in the companies of Merce Cunningham, Martha Graham, and George Balanchine, and founded his own in 1954. Dancers and choreographers who have emerged from his company include Twyla Tharp, Pina Bausch, David Parsons, Laura Dean, Bettie de Jong, Dan Wagoner, Carolyn Adams, Elizabeth Keen, Christopher Gillis, Senta Driver, Amy Marshall, Lila York, Patrick Corbin, and Takehiro Ueyama.

Michael Novak was appointed artistic director designate by Taylor in the spring of 2018, and took over as artistic director in September 2018 after Taylor died.

History

The Paul Taylor Dance Company was founded in 1954. One of the early touring companies of American modern dance, the Paul Taylor Dance Company has performed in more than 520 cities in 64 countries. In most years, about half of each performance season is spent touring in the United States. They first performed in Europe in 1960 and since have toured in Central and South America, throughout North America, in India, China, Korea, Asia, Australia, New Zealand, Indonesia, Africa, the Middle East, the Baltics, and Russia.

Twyla Tharp joined Paul Taylor Dance Company in 1963 and two years later formed her own company. Carolyn Adams joined the Paul Taylor Dance Company in 1965. During Adams's seventeen year career with the company, she starred in several major productions including Orbs in 1966, Big Bertha in 1971; Aureole and Esplanade in 1975; and Le Sacre du Printemps (The Rehearsal) in 1980. Christopher Gillis joined in 1976. He was a member until his death in 1993. Bettie de Jong joined the Taylor Company in 1962. Noted for her strong stage presence and long line, she was Paul Taylor's favorite dancing partner and, as current Rehearsal Director, was his right hand for the past half-century. She finished her active dancing career in 1985 but remains the Company's Rehearsal Director to this day.

The Taylor School has taught Taylor's style to professional-level dancers since 1984.

Mr. Taylor established Taylor 2 Dance Company in 1993 to ensure that his works could be seen by audiences all over the world regardless of economic considerations and the logistical limitations of non-traditional venues. While the Paul Taylor Dance Company is still performing and touring throughout the world, Taylor 2 has been temporarily closed.

In 2005, it was among 406 New York City arts and social service institutions to receive part of a $20 million grant from the Carnegie Corporation, which was made possible through a donation by New York City mayor Michael Bloomberg.

In 2015, Taylor began a new program, called Paul Taylor American Modern Dance, in which works of modern dance by choreographers other than Taylor are included in the company's annual season at the Koch Theater at Lincoln Center.

Performances and repertory 
Paul Taylor Dance Company's annual New York seasons have been presented at Lincoln Center's David H. Koch Theater since 2012. Prior to that, beginning in 1977, New York City Center hosted the company's seasons, which have typically lasted up to three weeks, comprising as many as 20 dances in a single season.

Taylor created numerous formal dances, often to classical music, with complex patterning and intricate formations with tempos varying with the musical sections, from andante to allegro. Examples include Esplanade, Brandenburgs, Mercuric Tidings, Aureole, Arden Court, and Promethean Fire.

Taylor has made many dramatic works. A few listed here include Big Bertha, From Sea to Shining Sea, American Genesis, The Word, Speaking in Tongues, Le Sacre du Printemps (The Rehearsal), Last Look, Black Tuesday, and To Make Crops Grow.

American Modern Dance Masterworks

Commissions

Board
The company is a charitable, not-for-profit organization managed by a board of trustees and a board of advisors, with board co-chairs Dr. Nancy H Coles, and Robert Aberlin, and vice-chairs Richard E. Feldman, Esq, Douglas L. Peterson, Stephen Kroll Reidy, treasurer Joseph A. Smith, and secretary Elise Jaffe.

Awards 
Kennedy Center Honors (1992)
MacArthur Fellowship (1985)
Primetime Emmy Award for Outstanding Choreography (1992)
Guggenheim Fellowship for Creative Arts (1961)
Bessie Lifetime Achievement Award (2012)

Video performances

References

External links
 
 Article at UCSB.edu
  1998
 
 Constructing The Wrecker's Ball Dance Magazine, October, 1996
 Archival footage of Paul Taylor Dance Company performing Airs in 1982 at Jacob's Pillow
 Archival footage of Taylor's "Company B" performed at the Jacob's Pillow Dance Festival in 2000

Contemporary dance companies
Dance companies in New York City
National Dance Award winners
1954 establishments in New York City
Arts organizations established in 1954